Ameles heldreichi is a species of praying mantis that lives in Macedonia, Croatia, Greece, Israel, Libya, Palestine, Turkey, Romania, Ukraine, Russia and Cyprus. Type locality is Putini (Croatia).

References 

heldreichi
Insects described in 1882
Mantodea of Europe
Insects of the Middle East
Insects of North Africa
Insects of Turkey
Taxa named by Carl Brunner von Wattenwyl